Kamal Anilkumar Somaia (born 22 July 1968) is a former English cricketer.  Somaia was a right-handed batsman who was a slow left-arm orthodox bowler. He was born at Wembley, London.

Somaia made his debut for Glamorgan in a List-A match against Somerset in 1989.  He played one further List-A match for the county in the 1989 season, which was against Derbyshire.  His first-class debut for the county came in the same season against Gloucestershire.  During the 1989 season, he played 2 further first-class matches for the county against Derbyshire and Leicestershire, against whom he took his only five wicket haul of 5/87 in what was his final first-class match.

Somaia also played 2 Minor Counties Championship matches for Staffordshire at Lichfield Road against Northumberland and Norfolk.  In 1990, he played 2 MCCA Knockout Trophy matches for the county, both coming against Oxfordshire.

References

External links
Kamal Somaia at Cricinfo
Kamal Somaia at CricketArchive

1968 births
Living people
Cricketers from Wembley
English cricketers
Glamorgan cricketers
Staffordshire cricketers
British Asian cricketers
British sportspeople of Indian descent